The Roman Catholic Diocese of Dali/Tali is a diocese located in the city of Dali in the Ecclesiastical province of Kunming in China.

In 2000, the Vatican appointed Lawrence Zhang Wen-Chang as Apostolic Administrator of Dali. He served until his death in 2012.

History

 November 22, 1929: Established as Mission “sui iuris” of Dali 大理 from the Apostolic Vicariate of Yunnanfu 雲南府
 December 13, 1931: Promoted as Apostolic Prefecture of Dali 大理
1938: The Cathedral was built by French missionaries.
 December 9, 1948: Promoted as Diocese of Dali 大理
1984: The Cathedral was rebuilt after suffering damage during the Cultural Revolution.

Architecture 
The Cathedral heavily incorporates elements of traditional Chinese architecture. It has a large crucifix on the exterior to identify itself as a church. The Cathedral's exterior and interior design provides visual associations with Daoist and Buddhist buildings found throughout China.

Leadership
 Bishops of Dali 大理 (Roman rite)
 Bishop Lucien Bernard Lacoste (December 9, 1948 – 1983)
 Prefects Apostolic of Dali 大理 (Roman Rite)
 Fr. Giovanni Battista Magenties (December 13, 1935 – 1947)

References

External links

 GCatholic.org
 Catholic Hierarchy
 Diocese website (Chinese) 

Roman Catholic dioceses in China
Christian organizations established in 1929
Roman Catholic dioceses and prelatures established in the 20th century
Christianity in Yunnan
Dali Bai Autonomous Prefecture